Dyson Perrins CofE Academy is a co-educational secondary school in Malvern, Worcestershire, England. It is named after its benefactor Charles William Dyson Perrins, heir to the Lea & Perrins Worcestershire sauce company. It  is located near Malvern Link, a northern suburb of the town of Malvern, Worcestershire.

History
The Church of England, under the Director of Education at the Diocese of Worcester, Canon Rees-Jones, had a plan to build a secondary school in the North of Malvern. This was frustrated by the raising of the school leaving age. The increased pupil numbers required a larger school, which exceeded the amount allotted by the Diocese. Canon Bamber, of Holy Trinity Church, approached C W Dyson Perrins, who agreed to finance the actual building costs, a sum of £10,000.

He was present for the laying of the foundation stone in 1956, but had died before its opening. His wife, Frieda Dyson Perrins, continued her family association with the school, helping to build future extensions.

The Church of England Dyson Perrins Secondary School, as it was named, was finally opened in 1959, at the time being the only secondary school in the county with a chapel incorporated into its design. The first headmaster of the school was Mr Sydney Bormond. The school was later renamed Dyson Perrins High School.

An inspection in January 2015 by the Office for Standards in Education (Ofsted), found the school to be 'Good'. Another inspection in 2018 found that the school continued to be Good.

Previously a voluntary aided school administered by Worcestershire County Council, in August 2011 Dyson Perrins CofE Sports College converted to academy status and was renamed Dyson Perrins Church of England Academy.

Blocks
The school is split into four buildings or 'blocks' in which different subjects are taught. The first block (referred to as 'A block') is the oldest block in the school. This block is split into two parts: one containing technology classrooms, workshops and two dedicated computer suites, and the other containing a variety of rooms including the main hall, reception and learning support centre.  This part of A Block also houses English, Food Technology, Textiles and Art classrooms. 'A block' also houses the Able Autism Base, a section of the school dedicated to supporting and including students with Asperger's Syndrome and High Functioning Autism, and one computer suite.

'B block' houses Mathematics, Science and History.

'C block' houses Performing Arts, Computing, Business, Music and Geography and has four dedicated computer suites.

'D block' holds the PE, RE, PSHE, and languages classrooms.

Headteachers
 Sydney Bormond 
 William 'Bill' Lucas 
 Peter Buchanan 
 David Griffin 
 Stuart Wetson   
 Peter Wallace 2018 (acting) 
 Mike Gunston 2018 to present

Notable former pupils 
 Jacqui Smith, former Home Secretary (2007–09)
 Cher Lloyd, singer-songwriter, 4th place on the 7th series of The X Factor (UK) in 2010 
 Rosie Spaughton, Youtuber
 Ian Bartlett, horse-racing expert and commentator
 Alexander M S Green, Chamber President of the First Tier Tribunal (General Regulatory Chamber) for Scotland, judge of the Employment Tribunal, judge of the First Tier Tribunal (Immigration and Asylum Chamber)

Other Malvern area secondary schools
 Hanley Castle High School
 The Chase

References

External links
 School Web Site
 Ofsted home page
 Ofsted report short inspection 2018 - Good
 Ofsted report 2015 - Good

Schools in Malvern, Worcestershire
Academies in Worcestershire
Church of England secondary schools in the Diocese of Worcester
Secondary schools in Worcestershire
Malvern, Worcestershire